Emily Vey Duke (born 1972, Halifax, Nova Scotia, Canada) is a Canadian-born visual artist who has worked collaboratively with Cooper Battersby since 1994. She is an associate professor in the Department of Transmedia at the College of Visual and Performing Arts at Syracuse University.

Career 
Duke completed a Bachelor of Fine Arts at the Nova Scotia College of Art and Design in Halifax, Nova Scotia. After graduating, Duke worked briefly as the artistic director at the Khyber Centre for the Arts in Halifax. She went on to complete her Master of Fine Art degree at the University of Illinois at Chicago.

Duke and Battersby were featured artists at the Images Festival in 2016 and were nominated for the Sobey Art Award in 2005 and 2010.

Duke has exhibited at the Vancouver Art Gallery, the Whitney Museum, and the Institute of Contemporary Art in Philadelphia. Additionally, Duke and Battersby participated in the International Film Festival of Rotterdam. Her video work is distributed by V-Tape in Toronto, Video Out in Vancouver, Argos in Brussels, and Video Data Bank in Chicago.

Duke also works as a writer and has been published in Border Crossings, Canadian Art, C Magazine, Fuse Magazine, and Mix Magazine.

References 

1972 births
Living people
Canadian women artists
Canadian video artists
Women video artists
NSCAD University alumni
Syracuse University faculty
University of Illinois Chicago alumni